Agra katewinsletae is a species of carabid beetle named after English actress Kate Winslet.

The holotype was collected in Costa Rica and first described to science in 2002. The species' discoverer, Terry Erwin, wrote: "The specific epithet, katewinsletae, is the Latinized genitive form of the combined name of the actress Kate Winslet, starlet of the movie Titanic. Her character did not go down with the ship, but we will not be able to say the same for this elegant canopy species, if all the rain forest is converted to pastures."

See also
List of organisms named after famous people (born 1950–present)

References

Lebiinae
Beetles of Central America
Endemic fauna of Costa Rica
Beetles described in 2002
Taxa named by Terry Erwin